In mathematics, the automorphism group of an object X is the group consisting of automorphisms of X under composition of morphisms.  For example, if X is a finite-dimensional vector space, then the automorphism group of X is the group of invertible linear transformations from X to itself (the general linear group of X).  If instead X is a group, then its automorphism group  is the group consisting of all group automorphisms of X. 

Especially in geometric contexts, an automorphism group is also called a symmetry group. A subgroup of an automorphism group is sometimes called a transformation group.

Automorphism groups are studied in a general way in the field of category theory.

Examples 
If X is a set with no additional structure, then any bijection from X to itself is an automorphism, and hence the automorphism group of X in this case is precisely the symmetric group of X.  If the set X has additional structure, then it may be the case that not all bijections on the set preserve this structure, in which case the automorphism group will be a subgroup of the symmetric group on X.  Some examples of this include the following:
The automorphism group of a field extension  is the group consisting of field automorphisms of L that fix K. If the field extension is Galois, the automorphism group is called the Galois group of the field extension.
The automorphism group of the projective n-space over a field k is the projective linear group 
In particular,  is an abelian group.
The automorphism group of a finite-dimensional real Lie algebra  has the structure of a (real) Lie group (in fact, it is even a linear algebraic group: see below).

If G is a group acting on a set X, the action amounts to a group homomorphism from G to the automorphism group of X and conversely. This extends to the case when the set X has more structure than just a set. For example, if X is a vector space, then a group action of G on X is a group representation of the group G, representing G as a group of linear transformations (automorphisms) of X; these representations are the main object of study in the field of representation theory.

Here are some other facts about automorphism groups:
Let  be two finite sets of the same cardinality and  the set of all bijections .
Let P be a finitely generated projective module over a ring R. Then there is an embedding , unique up to inner automorphisms.

In category theory 
Automorphism groups appear very naturally in category theory.

If X is an object in a category, then the automorphism group of X is the group consisting of all the invertible morphisms from X to itself. It is the unit group of the endomorphism monoid of X. (For some examples, see PROP.)

If  are objects in some category, then the set  of all  is a left -torsor.

In particular, if G is a group viewed as a category with a single object * or, more generally, if G is a groupoid, then each functor , C a category, is called an action or a representation of G on the object , or the objects . Those objects are then said to be -objects (as they are acted by ); cf. -object. If  is a module category like the category of finite-dimensional vector spaces, then -objects are also called -modules.

Automorphism group functor 
Let  be a finite-dimensional vector space over a field k that is equipped with some algebraic structure (that is, M is a finite-dimensional algebra over k). It can be, for example, an associative algebra or a Lie algebra.

Hence,  is a linear algebraic group over k.

In general, however, an automorphism group functor may not be represented by a scheme.

See also 
Outer automorphism group
Level structure, a technique to remove an automorphism group
Holonomy group

Notes

Citations

References

External links 
https://mathoverflow.net/questions/55042/automorphism-group-of-a-scheme

Group automorphisms